Broughton Island is a  island in the Arctic Archipelago.

Geography
To the east Baffin Bay, and the Baffin Mountains are located to the west, more specifically the Arctic Cordillera mountain range.

Demographics
The only community on the island is Qikiqtarjuaq with a population of 593. It is one of only eleven islands, out of more than 36,000, in the Arctic Archipelago that are inhabited.

Qikiqtarjuaq hosts an annual "Suicide Prevention Walk".

The island was the home of FOX-5, a Distant Early Warning Line and now a North Warning System site.

There is also an access road that was built to Tisunaaq, also known as Ceetee Land to the Elders, and another road is in construction to Qikiqtarjuaqruluk, or Old Broughton, an abandoned settlement.

Wildlife
The island is known for Arctic wildlife including ring seals, polar bears, bowhead whales, narwhals, and bird watching. It serves as the northern access point for Auyuittuq National Park (see also Pangnirtung) and is approximately 2 hours by boat in the summer months, 2 - 2.5 hours by vehicle or snowmobile in winter months. All park visitors must register and book an orientation session prior to entry into the park, and non-Inuit who visit Auyuittuq must do so by hiring a local licensed operator.

Gallery

Climate
Broughton Island has a tundra climate (ET), with the warmest month averaging below . Summers tend to be cool with chilly nights, while winters are long and cold. Early winter is the snowiest time of the year, with more than half of all year snowfall on average falling during this period.

References

Islands of Baffin Island
Islands of Davis Strait
Inhabited islands of Qikiqtaaluk Region